Hikaru Mori (born 7 July 1999) is a Japanese individual and synchronised trampoline gymnast.

She won the silver medal in the women's individual event at the 2018 Asian Games held in Jakarta, Indonesia.

In 2018, she also won the gold medal in the women's synchro event, alongside Megu Uyama, at the Trampoline Gymnastics World Championships held in Saint Petersburg, Russia. In 2019, she won two gold medals at this competition, in the women's individual and women's individual team events.

References

External links 
 

Living people
1999 births
Gymnasts from Tokyo
Japanese female trampolinists
Gymnasts at the 2018 Asian Games
Medalists at the 2018 Asian Games
Asian Games silver medalists for Japan
Asian Games medalists in gymnastics
Medalists at the Trampoline Gymnastics World Championships
Gymnasts at the 2020 Summer Olympics
Olympic gymnasts of Japan
21st-century Japanese women